Ione Reed (1903–1985) was an American film actress. She played the female lead in a number of silent westerns.

Selected filmography
 A Desperate Chance (1925)
 Fighting Luck (1925)
 The Road Agent (1925)
 The Texas Terror (1925)
 Blue Streak O'Neil (1926)
 Chasing Trouble (1926)
 Bucking the Truth (1926)
 Rider of the Law (1927)
 Outlaw's Paradise (1927)
 Across the Plains (1928)
 Cheyenne Trails (1928)
 Trails of Treachery (1928)
 West of the Rockies (1929)
 An Oklahoma Cowboy (1929)
 Captain Cowboy (1929)
 Riders of the Storm (1929)
 Below the Border (1929)
 The Man from Nowhere (1930)
 Western Honor (1930)
 Melody Trail (1935)
 The Buccaneer (1938)
 First Yank into Tokyo (1945)

References

Bibliography
 Katchmer, George A. A Biographical Dictionary of Silent Film Western Actors and Actresses. McFarland, 2015.

External links

1903 births
1985 deaths
American film actresses
Actresses from Texas